"Plage" is the sixth single by English electronic band Crystal Fighters from their album Star of Love. The single was released on 8 August 2011 through Zirkulo records, to positive reviews.

Release
The release of this single coincided with the release of the "Deluxe Edition" of the album. The single was released through PIAS to the continental European market earlier in the year  to both positive reviews and chart success in the Netherlands.

An acoustic version of the song was recorded on the UK TV show, "Abbey Road Debuts", produced by Channel 4 and aired in April 2011. The song also featured in a TV advert named "Forever Spring" for UK clothing retailer Matalan as well as another for US retail corporation Target and the UK's Sky.

Music video
The music video for this single features live footage of Crystal Fighters from their 2010 / 2011 tour, with footage from Belgium, UK, Spain and Mexico.

Track listing

Reception
Whiteboard music awarded the single 8.7 out of 10, citing that the single "is an extraordinarily pleasant breath of fresh air into the current indie music scene".
On-line music magazine, This is Fake DIY, states: 
It was named by on-line music magazine, The Music fix, as a "single of the week" on 7 August 2011.

Charts

Weekly charts

Year-end charts

References

2011 singles
Crystal Fighters songs
2010 songs